Velachery twin flyovers is a set of two L-shaped flyovers currently under construction at the Vijayanagar Junction in the neighbourhood of Velachery in Chennai, India. It is being constructed at a cost of  1080 million.

History and design
The plan for the flyovers was first proposed in 2010. The first-level flyover will connect the Velachery Bypass Road with the Velachery–Tambaram Road near the Velachery MRTS station. This flyover will have 15 spans and will land around 190 meters ahead of the MRTS bridge. The second-level flyover will connect the Taramani Link Road and the Velachery Bypass Road. It will be 1,200 meters long and will have 32 spans. The central span of this flyover is the longest of all, at 40 meters length, right above the Vijayanagar junction. The height of the second flyover will be 15 meters.

Traffic
As of 2010, the junction had a traffic density of 13,000 vehicles daily during peak hours. About 522 bus services are operated from the Vijayanagar terminus at the junction every day by the Chennai Metropolitan Transport Corporation.

See also

 Flyovers in Chennai

References

Bridges completed in 2019
Road interchanges in India
Bridges and flyovers in Chennai